Katherine Anna Kang (born December 15, 1970) is an American video game designer.

Career
In 2000, as founder and CEO of Fountainhead Entertainment, she championed machinima and became known as one of machinima's biggest supporters.  Through Fountainhead Entertainment, she produced, wrote, and directed a variety of machinima pieces and co-founded the Academy of Machinima Arts & Sciences.  In Machinima For Dummies, the machinima piece Anna is mentioned as “… one of the top ten list of every prominent machinima maker in the world.”

While at Fountainhead Entertainment, Kang produced and designed mobile games for id Software.  Mobile game titles Doom RPG and the Orcs & Elves series were heralded as some of the best mobile games of their time. Orcs & Elves was eventually ported to the Nintendo DS with Kang producing and designing.

In 2000, Kang wrote, directed, and produced the documentary Gamers. The documentary included interviews from video gaming luminaries, with a brief focus on history and predictive trends. The documentary was release in limited distribution throughout Europe and the US in 2001.

Formerly, Kang was the Director of Business Development for id Software where she worked on Quake III Arena and various mission packs and Quake II ports. In 2008, she returned to id Software as President of id Mobile where she produced and designed Wolfenstein RPG and Doom II RPG.  She also produced the iPhone-only game Doom Resurrection. A 2014 article listed her as a "former director of business development at id Software", following her husband's departure from id in 2013.

Kang is also co-founder of Armadillo Aerospace.

Personal life
Kang married computer programmer and businessman John Carmack on January 5, 2000.  In August 2004, Kang gave birth to their first child. Their second child was born in November 2009. Due to her involvement with id Software and John Carmack, she was mentioned in the final chapters of Masters of Doom. The couple divorced in 2021.

Awards
Through Fountainhead Entertainment, Kang has won the following awards:
 AMAS Best Technical Achievement for Anna
 AMAS Best Direction for In The Waiting Line
 IGN.com Adventure Game of the Year for Doom RPG
 1UP.com Mobile Game of the Year for Doom RPG
 Gamespot’s Mobies Mobile Game of the Year for Doom RPG
 Academy of Interactive Arts and Sciences Best Cell Game for Orcs & Elves
 IGN.com Best of E3 – Best Wireless RPG for Orcs & Elves
 IGN.com Best Wireless Story for Orcs & Elves
 Leipzig Game Convention Best Mobile Game for Orcs & Elves

Machinima
Fountainhead's machinima include the award-winning short Anna; In The Waiting Line, aired on MTV; Game Over, aired on UPN; and Sidrial released via Fileplanet.

Games
 Quake II (1997), for Microsoft Windows, Linux, Mac OS X, developed by id Software, published by Activision
 Kingpin: Life of Crime (1999), for Microsoft Windows, Linux Interplay Entertainment Corp
 Quake III Arena (1999), for Microsoft Windows, Linux, Mac OS X, developed by id Software, published by Activision
 Doom RPG (2005), developed by id Software, published by JAMDAT
 Orcs & Elves (2006), for mobile phone, developed by id Software, published by EA
 Orcs & Elves (2007), for Nintendo DS, developed by id Software, published by EA Mobile
 Orcs & Elves 2 (2007), developed by id Software, published by EA Mobile
 Wolfenstein RPG (2008), for mobile phone, by id Software, published by EA Mobile
 Doom Resurrection (2009), for iOS, developed by id Software
 Doom 2 RPG (2010), for mobile phone, by id Software

References

Further reading
 Hugh Hancock and Johnnie Ingram (2007). Machinima for Dummies, New Jersey: Wiley Publishing.  .
 Holly Cefrey (2008). Career Building through Machinima, New York: The Rosen Publishing Group.  .

External links
 Game Developer: Fountainhead's Kang on Orcs&Elves
GamerGirlz spotlight on Kang
Wired article on Machinima
CNN Money article on Machinima
Machinima Anna video on YouTube created by Katherine Anna Kang 

1970 births
Living people
American aerospace businesspeople
American film producers
American technology chief executives
American women chief executives
Place of birth missing (living people)
Id Software people
Machinima
American women company founders
American company founders
American women film producers
21st-century American women
Women video game designers